MPRP may refer to:
 Muslim People's Republic Party
 Mongolian People's Revolutionary Party (disambiguation) 
 Maine Power Reliability Program